William "Merry" Kimber (8 September 1872 – 26 December 1961), was an English Anglo concertina player and Morris dancer who played a key role in the twentieth century revival of Morris Dancing, a form of traditional English folk dancing. He was famous both for his concertina playing and for his fine, upright dancing, such that in his day he was presented in the highest circles of society.

Kimber was born at Headington Quarry, Oxford, and had left school at the age of nine to work as a bird-scarer before taking up the trade of a bricklayer.  However Kimber also played the concertina for his local Morris Dancers, the Headington Quarry Morris Men, and he was the musician when they were encountered by Cecil Sharp in 1899. Sharp, who was to be in the forefront of the revival of English folk music and dancing, noted down his first Morris tunes from Kimber's playing. Subsequently Kimber acted as Sharp's informant on the Headington Quarry Morris tradition, and as his assistant at lectures — Sharp would lecture on them while Kimber demonstrated the dances and played the concertina. Kimber's fame grew, and he danced at the Royal Albert Hall, the Mansion House, and in front of King Edward VII and Queen Alexandra at Chelsea Hospital. Kimber's version of the folk tune Country Gardens was noted by Cecil Sharp, and musicians from Percy Grainger to Jimmie Rodgers went on to popularise the tune. 

Kimber's Anglo concertina playing — making use of the left-hand to add simple but effective chordal and rhythmic accompaniments — showed great vitality and lightness of touch. The recordings made of Kimber, many of which are now available on CD, are among the very few recordings that exist of English traditional concertina players, and have been very influential on later twentieth century exponents of the instrument.

In 1894, Kimber married Florence Cripps, and they had eight children. "Merry" Kimber built a house for himself in St Anne's Road, Headington Quarry in 1911, which he named "Merryville". His wife died in 1917, and in 1920 he married Bessie Clark, and that year he revived the Headington Quarry 'side' that he had formed in 1910.

In 1922, Kimber was presented with the gold medal of the English Folk Dance Society at the music festival held in the gardens of New College, Oxford, with the professor of music, Sir Hugh Allen, presiding in a smock and a garlanded top hat. From 1946, Kimber taught Morris dancing to boys at Headington Secondary School.

Kimber died in 1961 at "Merryville", and at his funeral at Holy Trinity Church, Headington Quarry, his coffin was carried by the Headington Quarry Morris Men in their Morris regalia.

Discography
 Absolutely Classic: The Music of William Kimber (1999). The English Folk Dance and Song Society
 The Art of William Kimber (1974) Topic Records

Country Gardens from The Art of William Kimber is included as track seven on the first CD of the Topic Records 70 year anniversary boxed set Three Score and Ten

References
The Anglo-Concertina Music of William Kimber — Worrall, Dan M. (2005) London, English Folk Dance and Song Society

External links 
Biography at local Headington website
Blue Plaque to William Kimber on his house in St Anne's Road
Scanned images of a newspaper cutting of William Kimber's obituary, and an image of him in Morris costume from The Morris Book (Cecil Sharp)

1872 births
1961 deaths
Folk dancers
British bricklayers
Concertina players
Topic Records artists